Southeast New Mexico College (formerly New Mexico State University Carlsbad) is a public community college  in Carlsbad, New Mexico.

Background 
The college was established in 1950 as Carlsbad Instructional Center. Afterward, it became a branch campus of New Mexico State University named New Mexico State University Carlsbad. In July 2021, the college became an independent public institution named Southeast New Mexico College.

Academics
The college offers certificate programs and associate degrees. It is also the provider of Adult Basic Education services (ABE) and host the regional Small Business Development Center (SBDC) and the Manufacturing Sector Development Program (MSDP) that serves business and industry training needs through customized programs in Eddy County. It is accredited by the Higher Learning Commission.

References

External links

Community colleges in New Mexico